Patrick Kohlmann (born 25 February 1983) is a German-Irish former professional football player and current assistant coach of Ole Werner at Werder Bremen. A Borussia Dortmund youth exponent, he played as a defender for Holstein Kiel, Union Berlin, Rot-Weiß Erfurt, and Borussia Dortmund II.

Club career
Born in Dortmund to a German father and Irish mother, Kohlmann began his football career with BV Westfalia Wickede, before moving on to TSC Eintracht Dortmund. In 1993, he impressed Bundesliga club Borussia Dortmund and signed for their youth team.

Kohlmann stayed at Borussia Dortmund for 14 years, where he elevated from youth player to playing for the reserves. His chances with the first team were limited, often as an unused sub. He finally got his chance in 2004 versus 1. FC Kaiserslautern but went off with a bad knee injury. It was to be his only season as a first team squad member. For the reserve team, he made 101 Regionalliga appearances with 2 goals.

In 2007, Kohlmann signed for Regionalliga Nord side Rot-Weiß Erfurt and helped in their push for promotion to the 3. Liga.

The next season, he joined fellow 3. Liga side 1. FC Union Berlin. Until his departure in 2014, he amassed 142 2. Bundesliga appearances scoring 2 goals.

Kohlmann signed for Holstein Kiel in July 2014. After 74 3. Liga caps for Holstein Kiel, he retired at the end of the 2016–17 season and became assistant coach at the club.

International career
Kohlmann represented the Republic of Ireland U21 national team five times. He made his debut on 19 August 2003, against Poland. He was also in the squad of Irish U-20 in 2000. Kohlmann was eligible to represent Ireland because of his Irish mother.

References

External links
 
 
 

1983 births
Living people
Irish people of German descent
German people of Irish descent
Footballers from Dortmund
German footballers
Association football defenders
Republic of Ireland association footballers
Republic of Ireland under-21 international footballers
Bundesliga players
2. Bundesliga players
3. Liga players
Borussia Dortmund players
Borussia Dortmund II players
FC Rot-Weiß Erfurt players
1. FC Union Berlin players
Holstein Kiel players